Andrés Isaac Villarreal Tudón (born October 22, 1996) is a Mexican diver.

References 

Living people
1996 births
Mexican male divers
Universiade medalists in diving
Universiade bronze medalists for Mexico
Medalists at the 2019 Summer Universiade
Divers at the 2020 Summer Olympics
Olympic divers of Mexico
Sportspeople from Nuevo León